D. purpurea may refer to:
 Dalea purpurea, the purple prairie clover, a flowering plant species native to central North America
 Digitalis purpurea, the common foxglove, purple foxglove or lady's glove, a flowering plant species native to most of Europe

See also 
 Purpurea (disambiguation)